Ilze Bērziņa (born 4 January 1984 in Rīga) is a Latvian chess player who holds the title of Woman Grandmaster (2009). She won the Latvian Chess Championship for women in 2004, 2008, 2012 and 2019.

Chess career

Ilze Bērziņa participated in World and European youth tournaments with good results:
 In 1996, fourth place in World Girls Under-12 Championship;
 In 1996, second place in World Girls Under-12 Championship (speed chess);
 In 1998, third place in European Girls Under-14 Championship.

Ilze Bērziņa played for Latvia in Chess Olympiads:
 In 1998, at first reserve board in the 33rd Chess Olympiad in Elista (+4 −3 =1);
 In 2000, at first reserve board in the 34th Chess Olympiad in Istanbul (+5 −2 =3);
 In 2004, at first reserve board in the 36th Chess Olympiad in Calvia (+7 −3 =2);
 In 2006, at first reserve board in the 37th Chess Olympiad in Turin (+5 −2 =3);
 In 2008, at second board in the 38th Chess Olympiad in Dresden (+6 −4 =1);
 In 2010, at third board in the 39th Chess Olympiad in Khanty-Mansiysk (+7 -0 =4). Ilze Bērziņa won the bronze medal at third board;
 In 2012, at third board in the 40th Chess Olympiad in Istanbul (+5 -2 =3);
 In 2014, at third board in the 41st Chess Olympiad in Tromsø (+4 -4 =2);
 In 2016, at third board in the 42nd Chess Olympiad in Baku (+6 -1 =3);
 In 2018, at second board in the 43rd Chess Olympiad in Batumi (+4 -0 =6).

Ilze Bērziņa played for Latvia in European Team Chess Championship (women):
 In 1999, at second board in 3rd European Team Chess Championship (women) in Batumi (+3 −4 =2);
 In 2011, at second board in 18th European Team Chess Championship (women) in Porto Carras (+3 −4 =2);
 In 2015, at third board in 20th European Team Chess Championship (women) in Reykjavik (+2 −2 =5);
 In 2019, at third board in the 22nd European Team Chess Championship (women) in Batumi (+2, =1, -4).

Ilze Bērziņa was Latvian Chess Federation General Secretary.

References

External links
 
 
 
 

1984 births
Living people
Latvian female chess players
Chess woman grandmasters
Sportspeople from Riga